The Arrows A9 was a Formula One car which the Arrows team used to compete in the 1986 Formula One season. It was powered by the massively-powerful BMW M12/13 turbocharged inline-four engine. Unlike the BMWs used by the Brabham and Benetton teams whose engines were maintained and updated regularly by BMW, the Arrows engines were maintained by Swiss engine guru Heini Mader and were rated as the least powerful of the BMW runners.

The A9 was supposed to replace the ageing A8 car, but it turned out to be worse than its predecessor. The new car was the team's first carbon composite chassis, built by British Aerospace but delays in manufacture caused the car to be late. Its lack of performance caused Dave Wass to quit Arrows. 

Because of this, the team stuck with the A8 from the previous season. As a result, the A9 only saw action at three races, at the German and Austrian Grands Prix, in the hands of Thierry Boutsen, in both of these races the car failed to finish after its turbocharger failed.

At the Hungarian Grand Prix teammate Christian Danner raced the A9 but retired after 7 laps with rear suspension failure.

The Arrows team found that the rear end was the major problem with the A9 and for a couple of races it was run with its new front end joined to the rear end of the A8. While this actually improved the performance of the new car, Arrows soon returned to running the older A8 for the balance of the season.

Arrows finished the season in 10th place, with a single point, earned by Boutsen's teammate Christian Danner in Austria while driving the A8.

Complete Formula One results
(key)

* scored with the Arrows A8

References

Arrows A9 at f1db

A09